Patrick Cullen Pinney (born June 30, 1952) is an American television, film and voice actor.

Early life, family and education
Pinney was born in San Francisco County, California. His mother's maiden name is his middle name.

He attended college at University of the Pacific in Stockton, California, where producer and director Dennis Jones was a classmate and roommate of his. Pinney's friends included assistant director Michele Panelli Venetis and San Francisco Bay area costumer Alison Barnwell Morris, with whom he costarred in The Deputy at the school's Rotunda Theatre.

Career
Pinney has performed in theaters in the United States and in Europe. After relocating to Los Angeles, he played three characters in a play. Afterwards he was approached by a producer who offered him a role in a Hanna-Barbera animation. From there he made the transition from a serious stage actor to voice. 

He has also done work on the television series Harry & the Hendersons.

Voice-over career
Pinney has provided voices for a number of animated characters, including Mighty Mouse in the short-lived Mighty Mouse: The New Adventures (1987–1988), Pa Gorg, Uncle Traveling Matt, Flange Doozer, and additional voices in the animated version of Fraggle Rock, Chico the Bouncer in the hybrid live-action/animated film Cool World (1992), the speaking voice of Painty the Pirate from the opening theme of SpongeBob SquarePants (1999–present) and Wormguy and Idikiukup in Men in Black: The Series.

He supplied the voice of the Fish Ghoulie in the Ghoulies sequel Ghoulies III: Ghoulies Go to College (1987) and voiced Stan in the video game The Curse of Monkey Island.

Pinney has appeared on the stop-motion animation series Robot Chicken as He-Man, Arnold Schwarzenegger, Sylvester, Monterey Jack, Ted Kennedy, Dick Cheney, and O. J. Simpson.

In the late 1980s, he worked on a number of projects. One was providing the voice for Mainframe in G.I. Joe: The Movie in 1987. A couple of years later, he was involved in another project. It was on the X-Men in 1989. He provided the voice for Wolverine in Pryde of the X-Men which was the pilot episode for an animated series which was never produced. He had given the character an Australian sounding accent instead of the Canadian one that was expected. An article by Simone Pozzoli for the Italian language OverNewsMagazine website notices that Pinney's Australian accent interpretation of the character could be interpreted as prophetic as Australian Hugh Jackman has played the part.  He has worked in the Phil Nibbelink and Simon Wells directed animation An American Tail: Fievel Goes West. From 1997 to 2001, he worked on Men in Black: The Series in episodes which include The Long Goodbye Syndrome in 1997, The Buzzard Syndrome, also in 1997 and The Big Bad Bug Syndrome in 1998.

Acting career (physical)

Film and television
Although Pinney's voiceover work is his primary career, he has appeared in some television and film roles. In 1979, he played the Captain of the Guards in the Ken Annakin-directed feature film The Fifth Musketeer which starred Beau Bridges, Sylvia Kristel and Ursula Andress. In 1983, he played a heckler in the Fantasy Island episode "God Child/Curtain Call". He appeared in The Terminator in 1984. In 2014, he played the part of Eugene Dugan in Atwill Web Series which was directed by Charles Dennis.

He also voicing characters in the films such as Beauty and the Beast, Aladdin, Toy Story, The Hunchback of Notre Dame, Hercules, Mulan, Atlantis: The Lost Empire, Treasure Planet, and Brother Bear.

Stage
In June 2015, Pinney appeared at the Sierra Repertory Theatre in the play Unnecessary Farce. The play also starred Daniel Hines, Kristin Howell, Ty Smith and Nick Ferruci. The story which was set in a small town motel with an embezzling mayor with undercover police trying to catch him. Pinney played the part of a 6.4 Scottish assassin. The reviewer for the Sierra Lodestar magazine said that audiences might recognize Pinney from his part as Painty the Pirate. Pinney and director Dennis Jones have a history that goes back to 1972 when they worked together at the theatre company for Fallon House.

Filmography

Film (animated)

Television (animated)

Acting roles (screen)

Acting roles (stage) (Selective)

References

External links
 

1952 births
Living people
American male film actors
American male video game actors
American male voice actors
Male actors from Los Angeles